The Lehigh Mountain Hawks women’s basketball team is a college basketball program representing Lehigh University in Bethlehem, Pennsylvania. The Mountain Hawks are a member of NCAA Division I basketball, and compete in the Patriot League. They are coached by Addie Micir, entering her 1st season as head coach. The Mountain Hawks currently play their home games at Stabler Arena.

History
Lehigh first sponsored a varsity women's basketball team for the 1974–75 season, just a few years after the university became coed. The team competed in the East Coast Conference from 1982–83 through the 1989–90 season. Muffet McGraw coached the team from 1982 to 1987 before becoming the head coach at Notre Dame. Lehigh is a charter member of the Patriot League, which began play in women's basketball in the fall of 1990. As of the end of the 2017–18 season, the Mountain Hawks have an all-time record of 571–599. They have won four conference championships in their history, including an East Coast Conference title in 1986 and three Patriot League titles in 1997, 2009 and 2010. They have made three NCAA Tournament appearances in program history and have lost in the first round all three times, losing 103–35 to Connecticut in 1997, losing 85–49 to Auburn in 2009, and losing 79–42 to Iowa State in 2010.

Home Arenas 
The team originally played its home games exclusively inside Grace Hall on Lehigh's main Asa Packer Campus. Upon the opening of Stabler Arena in 1979, Lehigh's women's team began playing select games at Stabler, while still playing a majority of their home games at Grace Hall. The program began playing its full home schedule at Stabler during the 1989-90 season. Through the 2017-18 season, Lehigh has compiled a 255-184 record at Stabler Arena.

Year-by-Year Records

NCAA tournament results

References

External links